The Aroostook Review is "the online literary journal of the English Program at the University of Maine at Fort Kent." Geraldine Cannon Becker is the editor-in-chief of the literary journal, initiated in 2006. The magazine publishes poetry, fiction, non-fiction, as well as artwork in each annual issue. The journal has not been published since 2011.

See also
List of literary magazines

References

Annual magazines published in the United States
American literature websites
Magazines established in 2006
Magazines published in Maine
Online literary magazines published in the United States
Poetry magazines published in the United States
University of Maine at Fort Kent